"Rip It Up" is a song from Australian rock band Jet's second album, Shine On (2006). It was released on 27 November 2006 as the album's second single in Australia. Fellow band members and brothers Chris and Nic Cester, together with Cameron Muncey, co-wrote the track.

At a concert at London's Brixton Academy Nic, the lead singer, announced "Here's a song we've written about Paris Hilton – it's called 'Rip It Up'", he referred to American socialite Paris Hilton. Contactmusic.com's reporter claims that the track "includes lyrics threatening to kill Hilton's pet dog... [and] includes a reference to her infamous sex video." The lyrics include a line from the 1939 film, The Wizard of Oz: "I'm gonna get you my pretty, and your little dog too."

"Rip It Up" debuted at No. 67 on the Australian ARIA Singles Chart and peaked at No. 49 for one week before leaving the top 50. "Rip It Up" was released in the United Kingdom as the fourth single from Shine On and as a limited edition 7-inch vinyl but failed to chart. A music video was made for the song

Track listing

Release history

References

2006 singles
2006 songs
Atlantic Records singles
Capitol Records singles
Jet (band) songs
Song recordings produced by Dave Sardy
Songs written by Cameron Muncey
Songs written by Chris Cester
Songs written by Nic Cester
Songs about socialites